Lwambo is a city of Haut-Katanga Province in the Democratic Republic of the Congo. As of 2012, it had an estimated population of 13,317.

References 

Populated places in Haut-Katanga Province